Richard Greene (1918–1985) was a British film and television actor.

Richard Greene may also refer to:

 H. Richard Greene, American actor
 Richard Greene (The Younger) (1560–1617), Knight and Lord of Bowridge Hill
 Richard Greene (colonist) (died 1622), first Governor of Wessagusset Colony in New England
 Richard Greene (antiquary) (1716–1793), English antiquary and collector of curiosities
 Richard Greene (musician) (born 1942), American violinist 
 Richard Greene (politician) (born 1950), Irish politician
 Richard Greene (journalist) (born 1954), journalist and author who created and hosted Air America's show Clout
 Richard Greene (writer) (born 1961), Canadian poet
 Richard D. Greene (born 1950), Chief Judge of the Kansas Court of Appeals
 Richard Plunket Greene (1901–1978), English racing driver, jazz musician, and author
 Richard Ward Greene (1792–1875), attorney
 Richard Wilson Greene (1791–1861), Irish judge
 Richard Greene, pastor of God's Ark of Safety
 Richard Greene, singer and songwriter for American a cappella group The Bobs

See also
Rick Greene (born 1971), Major League Baseball relief pitcher
Richard Green (disambiguation)